This is an alphabetical list of sovereign states and dependent territories in the Americas. It comprises three regions, Northern America (Canada and the United States), the Caribbean (cultural region of the English, French, Dutch, and Creole speaking countries located on the Caribbean Sea) and Latin America (nations that speak Spanish and Portuguese). The Americas are almost entirely located in the Western Hemisphere, with some of the north-west islands of Alaska entering the Eastern Hemisphere. The majority of islands lying in the Atlantic between the Americas and Afro-Eurasia, such as Iceland, are not normally associated with the Americas and are therefore excluded from this list.

Sovereign states
The following is a list of sovereign states in the Americas. All 35 states are members of the United Nations and the Organization of American States.

Constituent parts of sovereign states

Dependent territories of sovereign states

See also
 List of countries in the Americas by population
 List of sovereign states
 List of sovereign states and dependent territories in North America
 List of sovereign states and dependent territories in South America
  and

Notes

 
Americas, The
Sta
Americas